Aaron Goldberg (born July 19, 1985) is an American professional golfer who plays on the Nationwide Tour and the Canadian Tour.

Goldberg was born in Encinitas, California, he attended San Diego State University where he earned a Bachelor of Science in Finance. He won the U.S. Intercollegiate and the Battle at the Lake as a freshman. In his senior season he won the District 7 Shootout, defeating Boise State's Troy Merritt in a playoff. He also got an All-American honorable mention. In 2008, he represented the United States in the Palmer Cup and was a medalist at the U.S. Amateur Public Links.

Goldberg turned professional in 2008 and joined the Canadian Tour in 2009. In 2010, he won three tournaments, the Canadian Tour Players Cup, the Clublink Jane Rogers Championship and the Canadian Tour Championship en route to winning the Canadian Tour Order of Merit. He earned $156,118 to break Trevor Dodds' single-season money record on Tour. He was also named the Canadian Tour Player of the Year. He has partial status on the Nationwide Tour in 2011. He was in contention at the Chiquita Classic going into the final round but finished in a tie for eighth.

Wealth management career 
Goldberg currently works as a Private Wealth Advisor and Certified Financial Planner Professional for AWM Capital. After a career as a professional golfer, where he says he saw "how many athletes lack financial education, leaving them to put faith in an advisor who does not understand the complexities and opportunities that being a professional athlete provides," which prompted him to enter the financial services industry with aspirations of changing the way athletes receive financial advice.

Personal life 
Goldberg lives in Encinitas, California with his wife Taylor and son.

Professional wins (3)

Canadian Tour wins (3)

U.S. national team appearances
Palmer Cup: 2008

References

External links

American male golfers
San Diego State Aztecs men's golfers
PGA Tour golfers
Golfers from California
People from Encinitas, California
Sportspeople from Carlsbad, California
1985 births
Living people